The Game-On series of academic conferences on simulation and artificial intelligence (AI) in computer games and digital entertainment (Game-On, Game-On NA, and Game-On Asia) has been organized by EUROSIS since  1997 and is aimed at bringing together researchers and practitioners of the games community to exchange ideas on applications and research beneficial both to the gaming industry, academia, and non-entertainment gaming communities.

History
The Game-On conferences started as a special session at TILE (Technology in Leisure Conference) which was held in the Netherlands in 1997.

References

Video game organizations